Altrincham Urban District, Cheshire was created 1894 and in 1937 became the Municipal Borough of Altrincham.

References

Altrincham
Municipal Borough of